Sari Bolagh (also Romanized as Sārī Bolāgh) is a village in Qeshlaq-e Jonubi Rural District, Qeshlaq Dasht District, Bileh Savar County, Ardabil Province, Iran. At the 2006 census, its population was 68, in 15 families.

References 

Tageo

Populated places in Bileh Savar County
Towns and villages in Bileh Savar County